Ali Yusuf Kenadid was a Somali ruler. He was the second ruler of the Sultanate of Hobyo.

History

See also
Osman Mahamuud
Osman Yusuf Kenadid
Mohamoud Ali Shire

References

External links
The Majeerteen Sultanates

Ethnic Somali people
Somali sultans
20th-century Somalian people
Darod
1911 deaths